The Knobs Region or The Knobs is located in the US state of Kentucky. It is a narrow, arc-shaped region consisting of hundreds of isolated hills. The region wraps around the southern and eastern parts of the Bluegrass region in the north central to northeastern part of the state. The western end of the Knobs region begins near Louisville, Kentucky and continues southeastward through Bullitt, Hardin, Nelson, LaRue, Marion, Taylor, Boyle, Casey and Lincoln counties before turning northeast and running along the Pottsville Escarpment and the Appalachian Plateau.

Many of the hills are conical and up to several hundred feet high, some with capstones that form cliffs. The monadnocks formed from the eroding margins of the Pennyroyal Plateau to the south and the Cumberland Plateau to the east. The caprock is Mississippian Harrodsburg Limestone and the slopes are Borden Formation shales of Devonian to Mississippian age.

See also
 Knobs State Forest

References

External links 
 Topomap of knobs

Regions of Kentucky
Geography of Jefferson County, Kentucky
Geography of Bullitt County, Kentucky
Geography of Hardin County, Kentucky
Geography of Nelson County, Kentucky
Geography of LaRue County, Kentucky
Geography of Marion County, Kentucky
Geography of Taylor County, Kentucky
Geography of Casey County, Kentucky
Geography of Lincoln County, Kentucky